Dolichoderus kutscheri is an extinct species of ant in the genus Dolichoderus. Described by Dlussky in 2008, the fossils of the species were found in the Bitterfeld amber, and is most likely to be from the Late Oligocene.

References

†
Oligocene insects
Prehistoric insects of Europe
Fossil taxa described in 2008
Fossil ant taxa